The Pawāyā image inscription is an epigraphic record documenting the dedication of a Vaiṣṇava image. It dates to the circa fifth century CE.

Location
Padmavati (Padmavati Pawaya)was a large city-site located in Gwalior District, Madhya Pradesh, India. The current location of the inscription is not recorded.

Publication
The inscription was first published by M. B. Garde in 1914-15. It was subsequently listed by H. N. DvivedI and M. Willis.

Description and Contents
The inscription is engraved on the pedestal of an image and records the dedication.

Metrics
The record is not metrical.

Text
Garde suggested the reading: namo bhagvate vi [-]m [pra]tima sthāpita bhagava(to).

Translation
Salutation to Vishnu, having installed the image.

See also
Indian inscriptions
 Padmavati Pawaya

Notes

Sanskrit inscriptions in India
Gupta and post-Gupta inscriptions